The 1904 United States presidential election in Massachusetts took place on November 8, 1904, as part of the 1904 United States presidential election. Voters chose 16 representatives, or electors to the Electoral College, who voted for president and vice president.

Massachusetts voted for the Republican nominee, President Theodore Roosevelt, over the Democratic nominee, former Chief Judge of New York Court of Appeals Alton B. Parker. Roosevelt won the state by a margin of 20.68%.

Results

See also
 United States presidential elections in Massachusetts

References

Massachusetts
1904
1904 Massachusetts elections